Wallace Choice Jr. (August 13, 1932 – September 9, 2018) was an American professional basketball player. He played college basketball for the Indiana Hoosiers. Choice played professionally with the Harlem Globetrotters and in the Eastern Professional Basketball League. After his retirement from playing, he became a prominent community activist in his hometown of Montclair, New Jersey.

Playing career
Choice was born in Montclair, New Jersey, and graduated from Montclair High School in 1952. He played college basketball for the Indiana Hoosiers and was the second African-American to play in the Big Ten Conference. Choice was appointed as team captain and became the first African-American to hold the role for a Big Ten team.

Choice played for the Harlem Globetrotters and in the Eastern Professional Basketball League (EPBL). He played for the Easton Madisons / Trenton Colonials and was a five-time selection to the All-EPBL Team. Choice led the EPBL in scoring twice: 1,033 points during the 1961–62 season and 956 during the 1962–63 season. His 41.3 points per game during the 1961–62 season were a league record.

Later life
Choice returned to Montclair where he became a real estate developer and owned retail outlets. He was a founding member of Montclair Grass Roots in 1968 which hosted summer camps. Choice was a community activist and nicknamed as a "godfather" of the Montclair community. Montclair Grass Roots led upgrades at Glenfield Park which renamed its Glenfield Park House to the Wally Choice Community Center in 2009.

Personal life
Choice met his wife at Indiana University. He had a son.

Death
Choice died aged 85 at the Mountainside Medical Center on September 9, 2018, after a short illness.

References

External links
College statistics

1932 births
2018 deaths
African-American basketball players
American community activists
American men's basketball players
Basketball players from New Jersey
Forwards (basketball)
Harlem Globetrotters players
Indiana Hoosiers men's basketball players
Montclair High School (New Jersey) alumni
People from Montclair, New Jersey
Sportspeople from Essex County, New Jersey
St. Louis Hawks draft picks
Trenton Colonials players